Denis Bazeley Gordon McLean  (18 August 1930 – 30 March 2011) was a New Zealand diplomat, academic, author and civil servant.

Biography
McLean was born in Napier. He was the eldest son of Gordon McLean, a newspaper editor, and Ruahine Smith. His family later lived in Auckland and Wellington.

He attended Nelson College from 1944 to 1948, earned a Master of Science with first-class honours in geology at Victoria University College, and won a Senior Scholarship in 1953 and a Rhodes Scholarship to the University of Oxford in 1954. At University College in Oxford he studied politics, philosophy and economics. He played rugby at both Victoria and Oxford Universities, and was a member of the Victoria team that won the Jubilee Cup three times in the early 1950s.

After graduating from Oxford, McLean joined the New Zealand Department of External Affairs in 1957. He was posted to Washington, D.C. (1960–63), Paris (1963–66), Kuala Lumpur (1966–68) and London (1972–77), where he studied at the Royal College of Defence Studies and was deputy high commissioner. He was Secretary of Defence from 1979 to 1988 and ambassador to the United States from 1991 to 1994.

After his retirement from government service in 1995, he served as the Joan and James Warburg Chair of International Relations at Simmons College in Boston. His distinguished career as a public servant, writer, historian and commentator on international relations also led him to be a visiting fellow at the Strategic & Defense Studies Centre, the Australian National University in Canberra, the Woodrow Wilson International Center for Scholars, the Carnegie Endowment for International Peace, and the U.S. Institute of Peace. He also served for several years on the New Zealand Press Council.

He wrote three books: The Long Pathway, Te Araroa (1986), about walking the east coast of the North Island with his family; The Prickly Pair (2003), on Australia-New Zealand relations; and Howard Kippenberger: Dauntless Spirit (2008), a biography of the military commander Sir Howard Kippenberger. The common theme underlying the apparent diversity of McLean's writing was a fascination with New Zealand's evolving national identity.

In the 1989 Queen's Birthday Honours, McLean was appointed a Companion of the Order of St Michael and St George.

He married Anne McLean in 1957, and had three children. McLean died on 30 March 2011 at his home in Wellington.

References

1930 births
2011 deaths
New Zealand Companions of the Order of St Michael and St George
Ambassadors of New Zealand to the United States
New Zealand public servants
People educated at Nelson College
Victoria University of Wellington alumni
Alumni of University College, Oxford
New Zealand academics
Simmons University faculty
New Zealand Rhodes Scholars
People from Napier, New Zealand
People from Wellington City